Abigail Louise Johnston (born November 16, 1989, in Upper Arlington, Ohio) is a former Olympic diver. At the 2012 Summer Olympics, she won a silver medal in the Women's synchronized 3 metre springboard with partner Kelci Bryant.  She also competed at the 2016 Olympics in the individual 3 m springboard.

Personal
Johnston is the daughter of David and Elaine Johnston.  She has two sisters, Adrienne and Leah. She earned her bachelor's degree at Duke University and during the 2016 Summer Olympics in Rio was a medical student at Duke, expecting to graduate as a medical doctor from Duke University School of Medicine in 2018.

References

External links 
 
 
 

Duke University School of Medicine alumni
Divers at the 2012 Summer Olympics
Divers at the 2016 Summer Olympics
People from Upper Arlington, Ohio
Living people
American female divers
Olympic silver medalists for the United States in diving
1989 births
Medalists at the 2012 Summer Olympics
Universiade medalists in diving
Universiade bronze medalists for the United States
Medalists at the 2009 Summer Universiade
21st-century American women